Monster Hunter Hunting Card (MHHC) is a trading card game based on the Monster Hunter video game franchise. It was released in Japan by Capcom on October 25, 2008 with periodic seasonal updates planned. So far no North American release is planned.

A 175-page art book entitled Monster Hunter Hunting Card Art Book containing artwork used on the cards was published in Japan on 2010.

Card types

There are six card types: Hunter, Otomo, Event, Quest, Target Monsters, and Guild Monsters.

Sets

So far eight sets have been released: Fang Rage, Arms of Hellfire, Shadow of the Forest, Golden Fury, King of the Ocean, King of the Frozen, The Strong Ties, and The Crimson Emperor.

External links
 Official Website (Japanese)
 Card Release Info

Card games introduced in 2008
Collectible card games
Monster Hunter